Ekaterina Aleksandrovna Ruzanova (née Demagina, born 16 August 1982) is a retired Russian basketball point guard. She was part of the Russian teams that won the 2007 European Championships and placed second at the 2006 World Championships.

References

1982 births
Living people
Russian women's basketball players
Point guards
Sportspeople from Tolyatti
21st-century Russian women